University of Pristina is a higher education institution founded in Pristina in 1969.
University of Pristina, a university located in Pristina
University of Priština (North Mitrovica), a parallel institution under Serbian administration (located in North Mitrovica, Kosovo)
University of Pristina (1969–99), the institution before the war

See also 
 Pristina (disambiguation)